Kenny Hall was born blind in San Jose, California on October 14, 1923. He attended the California School for the Blind in Berkeley, where he learned his first music on violin. He later worked in broom factories in both Oakland and San Jose. Over the course of his life, he learned over 1,100 tunes from fellow students at the School for the Blind, coworkers at the broom factories, 78rpm records, and artists like the Happy Hayseeds he heard on the radio. Though he played Old-time music on fiddle and mandolin, he played many tunes from Ireland, Mexico, Scotland, Italy, Portugal, and elsewhere in the world. He picked up the Italian-style bowlback mandolin in 1937 and learned from a blind Texas-born mandolin player named W.D. Sanford. His eclectic repertoire and distinctive mandolin style were influential among folk musicians in the San Francisco Bay Area and San Joaquin Valley.<ref>'Kenny Hall, In Memoriam. Fresno Folklore Society. ' Retrieved from https://www.fresnofolklore.org/artist_profile_kenny_hall.html. Accessed November 16th, 2020</ref>Kenny Hall. Retrieved from https://www.allmusic.com/artist/kenny-hall-mn0000710621/biography. Accessed November 16th, 2020Vykki Mende Gray. (2013) KENNY HALL (OCTOBER 14, 1923 - SEPT. 18, 2013) JAMMING WITH THE ANGELS! FolkWorks. Retrieved from https://folkworks.org/features/passings/41952-obit-kenny-hall. Accessed November 16th, 2020

Publications
Kenny Hall and Vykki Mende Gray. (1999) Kenny Hall's Music Book: Old-Time Music for Fiddle and Mandolin'' (Mel Bay Publications)

External links
 Kenny Hall discography at Discogs

References

Musicians from California
Music of California
Music of the San Francisco Bay Area
Musicians from the San Francisco Bay Area
Old-time fiddlers
American mandolinists
Old-time musicians
1923 births
2013 deaths